Billy Ray Hoffman is an American country music singer and songwriter. He released one album, All I Wanted Was You, in 2000. This album charted the singles "Perfect Night" and "You're the Ticket".

Biography
Billy Ray Hoffman was born in Arkansas and raised in Poteau, Oklahoma. He was born with a hearing problem and is only three percent away from being deaf. He also learned to play guitar to gain dexterity after being born with underdeveloped hands.

In 2000, he was the first artist signed to Critter Records, which was managed by Joe Stampley. Stampley produced Hoffman's debut album, which included a cover of Paul Davis' "I Go Crazy." Two singles from the album charted on the Billboard Hot Country Singles & Tracks chart. The album received a mixed review from Ray Waddell of Billboard, who wrote that "while lacking the vocal gymnastics heard in much of what populates current country radio, Hoffman's easygoing style mostly serves this material well." Hoffman retired from the music business after his first album and moved back to Poteau to focus on various business ventures.

Discography

All I Wanted Was You (2000)

Track listing
"All I Wanted Was You" (Jon Bon Jovi) - 4:01
"I Go Crazy" (Paul Davis) - 4:42
"Destination Unknown" (Tom Botkin, Les Rawlins, Donnie Skaggs) - 3:22
"Crossing Fences" (Botkin, Toni Dae, Elliott James) - 3:56
"It Just Hurts a Little" (Botkin, Skaggs, Hoffman) - 3:40
"You're the Ticket" (Jess Brown, Wade Kirby, Keith Follesé) - 2:37
"One Bad Habit" (Tony Stampley, Hoffman) - 3:24
"Perfect Night" (Stampley, Dae) - 3:25
"You Call That a Mountain" (Michael Garvin, Bucky Jones) - 3:25
"Saved by a Southern Belle" (Marv Green, Trey Bruce) - 3:12

Personnel
From All I Wanted Was You liner notes.

Larry Beaird - acoustic guitar
Dennis Burnside - piano, organ
Mike Chapman - bass guitar
J. T. Corenflos - lead guitar
Jeffrey C. King - lead guitar
Tammy Pierce - background vocals
John Wesley Ryles - background vocals
Scott Sanders - steel guitar
Milton Sledge - drums
Joe Spivey - fiddle, mandolin
Joe Stampley - producer
Jamie Tate - engineering

Singles

Music videos

References

American country singer-songwriters
American male singer-songwriters
Living people
Country musicians from Arkansas
Deaf musicians
People from Poteau, Oklahoma
Singer-songwriters from Oklahoma
Singer-songwriters from Arkansas
American deaf people
Country musicians from Oklahoma
Year of birth missing (living people)